Splitsvilla 14, styled as Splitsvilla X4, is the fourteenth season of the Indian reality series MTV Splitsvilla. Shot in Goa, the season was hosted by Sunny Leone and Arjun Bijlani along with Anushka Mitra and Abhimanyu Raghav as Villa Insiders. It premiered on 12 November 2022 on MTV India

Production

Development 
In August 2022, MTV India dropped Rannvijay Singha for the upcoming season and was replaced by Arjun Bijlani.

In October 2022, MTV India announced the series with Sunny Leone returning as host alongside Arjun Bijlani.

Filming 
The principal photography of the series commenced in September 2022 in Goa. Bijlani and Leone had been spotted shooting on Monday 26 September 2022.

Release 
On 16 October 2022, a promo revealing the season's theme was released on MTV India official Instagram and Twitter handles.

Contestants

  indicates female contestants. 
  indicates male contestants. 
  indicates original contestants. 
  indicates wild-card contestants.

Twists

Isle of Venus & Isle of Mars
The season had two islands for boys and girls unlike previous seasons. The girls' island was named Isle of Venus whereas the boys' island was named Isle of Mars. To meet each other contestants had to win the challenges. On Episode 11, The Isle of Mars and Isle of Venus were connected as one Splitsvilla.

Oracle Cards
Cards of Oracle (Luck Card, Power Card and Joker Card) was introduced that would be revealed at a particular time in dome sessions which can change the dynamics of the show.

Ideal Matches

Season Overview

First Boys Challenge: Impress Me If You Can 
Before the challenge, boys had to divide themselves into two teams.

In this challenge, the boys had to impress host Sunny Leone in various categories. The winning team will go to Isle of Venus and meet the girls.

In a twist, the losing team Five Lovers had the power to block one boy from Spartans not to go on Island Fling and meet the girls. They choose Aagaz.

First Island Fling 
The winners of Impress me if you can Challenge got to spend time with the girls. Boys gave a rose to two girls each of their choice and went on a date with them.

First Couple Challenge: Mela Dilon Ka 
The four boys had to choose one girl from their date to couple-up for this challenge.

Justin & Sakshi S and Sohail & Saumya won the challenge and were safe in the Dome Session.

Later in the first dome session, Dhruvin was dumped by Justin & Sakshi S.

First Girls Challenge: Water Goal 
Before the challenge, Uorfi Javed entered the Isle of Venus as wild-card. She was the Queen Bee of one team and had to choose one girl to be another Queen Bee. She chose Soundous.

Uorfi and Soundous had to choose their teams.

Oviya was not chosen and was directly in dumping zone.

In each round, winning team got to block one girl from going to Isle of Mars and will not get to meet the boys.

Aradhana, Pema, Akashlina, Sakshi S and Sakshi D were blocked.

Uorfi, Soundous, Saumya, Kashish R and Shrea suruvived and go to Isle of Mars to meet the boys.

Second Island Fling 
The winners of Water Goal Challenge got to spend time with the boys. Girls gave a rose to two boys each of their choice and went on a date with them.

Second Couple Challenge: Taste of Love 
The five girls had to choose one boy from their date to couple-up for this challenge. But only 4 couples could compete in this challenge, Queen Bees (Uorfi & Soundous) had to choose one couple to challenge. The couple not chosen was Saumya & Sohail.

Uorfi & Kashish T and Soundous & Hamid won the challenge and were safe in the Dome Session.

In Isle of Venus, rest of the girls had to predict which girl will win the Challenge. Sakshi D and Akashlina won advantage.

Later in the second dome session, Oviya was dumped by Uorfi & Kashish T  and Hamid & Soundous.

Second Boys Challenge: Bouquet of Love 
Before the first challenge, boys had to divide themselves into three teams.

The winning team (Aagaz, Rishabh and Sohail) were going to Isle of Venus. Team A finished second had to choose one teammate to go to Isle of Venus. They choose Honey.

Third Island Fling 
The winners of Challenge got to spend time with the girls in a Pool Party and each girl gave a rose to a boy, the boy receiving the least roses will leave Isle of Venus.

Aagaz and Sohail received two roses, but Sohail decided to give one rose to Aagaz. Therefore, Aagaz, Rishabh and Honey stayed back at Isle of Venus for a night.

Third Couple Challenge: Mujhe Rang De 
The three boys had to choose one girl to couple-up for this challenge.

Aagaz & Aradhana and Honey & Akashlina won the challenge and were safe in the Dome Session.

Later in the third dome session, Rishabh was dumped by Honey & Akashlina.

Fourth Island Fling 
All the girls got to spend time with the boys in Isle of Mars. The girls had to pair-up and choose one boy to form a trio to compete in the challenge.

Honey, Kashish T and Aagaz were not chosen and didn't compete.

Fourth Couple Challenge: Namak Ishq Ka 
Uorfi swapped herself with Sakshi D in a trio.In the challenge the 5 trios had to form 2 groups to compete in this challenge. Uorfi, Saumya and Sohail were not in any group and didn't compete.

Pema, Shrea & Amir and Soundous, Akashlina & Hamid won the challenge and were safe in the Dome Session.

Later in the fourth dome session, Saumya & Sohail was dumped by Pema, Shrea & Amir. Uorfi was revealed as Mischief Maker by Luck Card and saved Sohail.

Fifth Island Fling 
Hiba, Prakshi and Mehak entered Isle of Mars as wild-card. They were given secret tasks to complete using boys.

Fifth Couple Challenge: Pyaar Ka Chakkar 

The wild-cards had to pair-up with one boy and choose one girl to form a trio to compete in the challenge.

Kashish T and Mehak won the challenge and were safe in the Dome Session. Since Prakshi's trio finished second she was also safe.Soundous, Akashlina and Hiba were directly in the dumping zone.

Later in the fifth dome session, Sakshi D, Akashlina and Joshua was dumped by Kashish T, Mehak and Prakshi respectively.Joker Card was revealed, Sakshi D and Akashlina was saved while Joshua was dumped by unsafe contestants.

Last Island Fling
Shivam Sharma entered Isle of Venus as wildcard.

The Isle of Mars and Isle of Venus were connected as one villa. With all boys entering Isle of Venus permanently.

First Activity: Entertainment Challenge

Justin & Sakshi S, Kashish T, Kashish R & Mehak and Amir, Pema & Shrea won the activity and qualified for the next challenge.

Sixth Couple Challenge: Be My Honey Bun
Before the challenge, non-performing contestants block one team from competing.

Amir, Pema & Shrea were blocked from performing.Justin & Sakshi S choose Prakshi to form a trio.

Justin, Sakshi S & Prakshi won the challenge and were safe in dome session.

Later in the sixth dome session, Akashlina was dumped by Justin, Sakshi S & Prakshi.The Oracle was introduced and Justin choose Sakshi S as connection for oracle. They were not an ideal match and Akashlina didn't get dumped.

Second Activity: Gossip with Golgappa 
Mischief Maker Uorfi Javed re-entered for this activity. She later introduced three new wild-cards: Moose Jattana, Tara Prasad and Samarth Jurel.

Not all contestants 'Golgappa received' shown in the television episode.

Hamid and Akashlina received the most Golgappas and were eligible to compete in the next challenge.

Seventh Couple Challenge: Bridge of Love 

Hamid and Akashlina pair-up with Soundous and Kashish T to compete against each other in the challenge.

Kashish T & Akashlina won the challenge and were safe in the Dome Session. 

Later in the seventh dome session, Shivam, Sakshi D and Aradhana were dumped by Kashish T & Akashlina, who become the first Ideal Match of the season.

Third Activity: Kabaddi! With A Twist of Love 
Before the challenge contestants divides themselves into two teams. 
Hiba was not in any team, she became the joker and could replace anyone for a round.

Team High won the activity and were eligible to compete in the next challenge.

Eighth Couple Challenge: Main Tera Dil Lungi 

Team High coupled up to compete in the challenge.

Amir & Pema and Hamid & Soundous won the challenge and were safe in the Dome Session.

Later in the eighth dome session, Kashish R and Samarth were dumped by Amir & Pema, who become the second Ideal Match of the season.

Fourth Activity: Wild Stone Hunt  
Before the activity girls divides themselves into two duo and one trio. Meanwhile Ideal Matches Kashish T & Akashlina and Amir & Pema went on a pool date.

Moose & Sakshi S won the activity and were eligible to compete in the next challenge.

Ninth Couple Challenge: Teri Cutlee Meri Juicelee 

Before the challenge, Moose & Sakshi S went on a date with their connections.
They coupled up with Honey and Justin to compete against ideal matches for their ideal match powers for the next dumping session. 

Honey & Moose and Justin & Sakshi S won the challenge and were safe in the Dome Session.

Later in the ninth dome session, Mischief Maker Uorfi Javed re-entered with two envelopes to reveal the ideal match powers.Both envelopes had power of dumping but one also had mischief that, "... the dumped couple will go to oracle and if they become ideal match they will replace the safe couple."Justin & Sakshi S received envelope with mischief and dumped Aagaz & Hiba. They didn't become an ideal match and were dumped. Honey & Moose dumped Shrea.

Fifth Activity: Kiss Kisko Pakdu 

Before the activity, contestants had to form a team.Sohail & Prakshi weren't chosen and were asked to block contestants from collecting and scoring frisbees. 

Hamid & Soundous and Justin & Sakshi S won the activity and were eligible to compete in the next challenge.

Tenth Couple Challenge: Kissa Kursee Ka 

Hamid & Soundous and Justin & Sakshi S teamed up with ideal matches and competed against each other for ideal match powers for the next dumping session. 

 

Hamid & Soundous and Kashish T & Akashlina won the challenge and were safe in the Dome Session.

Later in the tenth dome session, Hamid & Soundous received power to send a couple to the oracle among unsafe contestants. They choose Honey & Moose, who become the third Ideal Match of the season.Ideal Match Kashish T & Akashlina dumped Sohail and Hamid & Soundous dumped Mehak.

Eleventh Couple Challenge: Aaja Meri Gaddi Mein Beth Ja
Before the challenge, performing contestants block one couple from competing.

Amir & Pema were blocked from performing.

 

Tara & Prakshi won the challenge.

Dome Session

Notes
  
 : The safe girls, Pema and Kashish R had power to mutually save one unsafe contestant.
 : During the Taste of Love challenge, Isle of Venus contestants make predictions of the winning couple. Since Akashlina and Sakshi D made correct predictions one of them will be saved by winning female contestants Uorfi and Soundous. As Uorfi and Soundous didn't come to a mutual decision Soundous got chance to use the power due to her performance in the challenge.
 : Unsafe girls saved one contestant among them. Oviya was saved but swapped herself with Sakshi D. 
 : Kashish T & Uorfi and Hamid & Soundous mutually dumped one unsafe contestant.
 : Unsafe contestants who write their connection name to save were saved.
 : Kashish T denied going to the oracle with Akashlina and they choose Hamid & Soundous for the oracle but the final decision was done by the voting of unsafe contestants. 
 : By wining Main Tera Dil Lungi challenge, Amir & Pema received special power to block the voting of two unsafe contestants.
 : The ideal matches had power to mutually save one unsafe couple. Kashish T didn't come to a mutual decision with others and the decision was taken by majority. 
 : Mischief Maker Uorfi Javed re-entered with two envelopes to reveal ideal match powers. Both envelopes had power of dumping but one also had mischief that, "... the dumped couple will go to oracle and if they become ideal match they will replace the safe couple."

 indicates male contestant.
 indicates female contestant. 
 indicates the contestants won the challenge and were safe. 
 indicates the contestants are an ideal match who holds ideal match powers in dome session and were safe. 
  indicates the contestant was safe prior to dome session.
  indicates the contestant was saved during dome session.
  indicates the contestant was unsafe. 
  indicates the contestants' name was written in queue card for dumping.
  indicates the contestant has been dumped.
  indicates the contestant has been eliminated outside the dome session.

See also
List of programmes broadcast by MTV (India)

References

External links 
 Splitsvilla X4 on MTV India
 Splitsvilla X4 on Voot

Indian reality television series
2022 Indian television series debuts
MTV (Indian TV channel) original programming
Hindi-language television shows
Flavor of Love